was an early seismologist at the Central Meteorological Observatory of Japan (now known as the Japan Meteorological Agency), researching deep (subduction zone) earthquakes.  His name is attached to the Wadati–Benioff zone. It was Wadati's 1928 paper on shallow and deep earthquakes, comparing maximum below surface displacement against distance from the epicentre, which led Charles Richter to develop his earthquake magnitude scale in 1935.

See also
List of geophysicists

References

External links
Kiyoo Wadati: Biographical information

Japanese geologists
Japanese seismologists
1995 deaths
Laureates of the Imperial Prize
1902 births
20th-century geologists
Tectonicists
Academic staff of Saitama University